Vitthalbhai Patel & Rajratna P. T. Patel Science College (VP & RPTP Science College) is a college run by the Charutar Vidya Mandal institution, located at Vallabh Vidhyanagar in Gujarat, India. The college is located in the CVM Higher Secondary Complex.. It was established on 27th August 1947.

Features 
The college building has more than 45 classrooms and accommodates about 2,500 students in each class of 15-16 divisions. In March 2013, the college was given a Grade A rating by a N.A.A.C peer review team of the University Grants Commission of New Delhi. It is one of the largest higher secondary schools, producing over 2,000 graduate students every year.

Location 
Raj
Vallabh Vidyanagar 388 120
Dist.: Anand
Gujarat, India

External links 
 Official site

Schools in Gujarat
Science colleges in India
Government schools in India
Education in Anand district
Science and technology in Gujarat